Applied Education is a school for bookkeepers and tax agents in Australia approved by the Tax Practitioners Board and Institute of Certified Bookkeepers.

The Australian Government created legislation called the Tax Agent Services Act 2009 (TASA) to ensure that people preparing Business Activity Statements for a fee are registered. The Tax Practitioners Board administers and manages the registration of bookkeepers in Australia. Before this, anyone could act as a bookkeeper, creating concern that businesses were receiving poor advice from unqualified people.

Applied Education is a Registered Training Organisation, which commenced in 1999.

References

Australian vocational education and training providers